Saffo may refer to:

Saffo (Mayr), 1794 opera by Mayr
Saffo (Pacini), 1840 opera by Pacini
Saffo in Leucade, by Francesco Morlacchi (1784-1841)
Paul Saffo (born 1954), American technology forecaster
Saffo the Greek, American organised crime figure, early 20th century
Saffo Music, 1977 album by Lara Saint Paul
Bill Saffo, Mayor of Wilmington, North Carolina

See also
Balcha Safo (1863-1936), Ethiopian general, alternative spelling
Sapho (disambiguation)
Sappho, Greek poet
Sappho (disambiguation)